The Mrs Edward B. Craig House is a historic mansion in Forest Hills, Tennessee, USA. The French-style mock castle was completed in 1935. It was designed by architect Herbert Rogers, an architect from New York. It was built for the widow of an insurance executive. It has been listed on the National Register of Historic Places since October 27, 2003.

References

Houses on the National Register of Historic Places in Tennessee
Houses completed in 1935
Houses in Davidson County, Tennessee
Mock castles
National Register of Historic Places in Davidson County, Tennessee